Shen County, or Shenxian, is a county of western Shandong province, People's Republic of China, bordering Henan to the south and southwest and Hebei to the west. It is the southernmost county-level division of the prefecture-level city of Liaocheng.

Geography and climate
It borders Guan County and Dongchangfu District to the north, Yanggu County across the Jinxian River to the east, Puyang City of Henan to the south, and Handan City of Hebei to the west.

Shen County has a monsoon-influenced, continental semi-arid climate (Köppen BSk) with four distinct seasons. Nearly half of the annual rainfall occurs in July and August alone.

Administrative divisions
There are 4 subdistricts, 16 towns and 4 townships in the county:

Subdistricts
Yanta Subdistrict
Shenting Subdistrict
Shenzhou Subdistrict
Donglu Subdistrict

Towns

Townships
Zudian Township
Xuzhuang Township
Wangzhuangji Township
Shiziyuan Township
Meizhong Township

Historical monuments
 Han Family Tombs, a  monumental complex at the graves of the local Tang-era jiedushi Han Yunzhong and his relatives. The complex includes a pair of giant tortoise-borne stelae (reminiscent of those at Shou Qiu) and other assorted statuary, in the spirit way tradition. It is on the national list of major historical and cultural sites.
 Tomb of Ma Benzhai (1902—1944), the leader of a Hui volunteer unit that fought against the Japanese invaders in the Second Sino-Japanese War.

References

External links
 Official home page

Shen
Liaocheng